The Cinnamon Red Colombo is a three-star hotel in Colombo, Sri Lanka. The 26-storey hotel is located at 59 Ananda Coomaraswamy Mawatha, Kollupitiya.

The Rs. 3.5 billion property was a tri-venture between John Keels Holdings (30%), Sanken Construction (51%) and a Singaporean 3rd party (19%). It was opened in September 2014 by the Minister of Economic Development, Basil Rajapaksa.

It is part of the Cinnamon Hotels and Resorts chain, under the management of  John Keells Group. The hotel is claimed to be South East Asia's first "Lean Luxury" hotel in Colombo. The hotel has previously won awards in Culinary Arts.

Cinnamon Red is noted for its use of red colour throughout the property. The property has also hosted a "paint the town red" competition since inception, promoting local artists showcasing their talent via murals throughout the property 

In 2020 the hotel was used as a paid isolation centre to facilitate seafarers arriving in the country to spend their mandatory quarantine period during the COVID-19 pandemic.

References 

2014 establishments in Sri Lanka
2019 Sri Lanka Easter bombings
Hotels in Colombo